Nickelodeon en Telemundo (English: "Nickelodeon on Telemundo") is a former American children's programming block that airs on the Spanish language television network Telemundo, which debuted on November 9, 1998, to September 30, 2001. The two-hour block – which airs Monday to Friday morning, later on Saturday and Sunday mornings from 6:30 a.m. to 9:00 a.m. Eastern Time and Pacific Time – features live-action and animated series aimed at children between the ages of 2 and 14.

Programs featured on the block consist almost entirely of Spanish-dubbed versions of series that were originally produced and broadcast in English (with the block featuring Spanish dubs of the joint agreement with Nickelodeon programming). All shows featured on Nickelodeon en Telemundo are designed to meet federally mandated educational programming guidelines defined by the Federal Communications Commission (FCC) via the Children's Television Act. Nickelodeon en Telemundo aired for the final time on September 30, 2001. The following week, the turns out of revival which borrowed its name from Telemundo's 1995-1998 Saturday morning block Telemundo Infantil (in English, Telemundo Kids), Telemundo Kids debuted.

History
On September 15, 1998, Telemundo entered into a programming agreement with Nickelodeon to carry the cable channel's programming as part of a morning children's program block, "Nickelodeon en Telemundo" ("Nickelodeon on Telemundo"). The block, which debuted on November 9, 1998 and was considered a sub-block of Telemundo Infantil, consisted of Spanish dubs of Nickelodeon's animated series aimed at older children and preschool-oriented programs aired by the channel's Nick Jr. block (such as Rugrats, Doug, Aaahh!!! Real Monsters, Hey Arnold!, Rocko's Modern Life and Blue's Clues). Nickelodeon en Telemundo were changed the schedule, it was relegated to Saturday and Sunday mornings from 7:00 a.m. to 10:00a.m. ET/PT, in order to accommodate a time slot for Hoy En El Mundo (or Esta Manana) with hosting by Jose Diaz-Balart.

In September 2001, the Nickelodeon blocks were discontinued after September 30, 2001, ahead of the expiry of Telemundo's program supply deal with Nickelodeon. It was then replaced with Telemundo Kids debut on October 6, 2001, which is joint venture of the animation of Columbia TriStar (such as Men in Black: The Series, Dragon Tales, Jackie Chan Adventures and Max Steel). However, Dragon Ball Z carried over to the block premiered following debut on October 6. Following across Sábados de Fantasía (Fantasy Saturdays) and Domingos de Aventura (Adventure Sundays) were schedule time in 7:00 a.m. to 10:00 a.m. ET/PT, some of Telemundo stations/affiliates were including the time schedule.

Programming

Schedule issues
Although the Nickelodeon en Telemundo block regularly aired on Monday to Friday mornings, affiliates in some parts of the country deferred certain programs within the lineup to Saturday and Sunday morning time slots to accommodate locally produced programs (such as weekend morning newscasts) or due to scheduling issues with regional or network sports broadcasts that start in time periods normally occupied by the block.

Former programming

See also
 Telemundo Kids – The block consisted of Spanish dubs of various Sony Pictures Television and BRB Internacional series, divided across Sábados de Fantasía ("Fantasy Saturdays") and Domingos de Aventura ("Adventure Sundays") from October 6, 2001 to September 3, 2006.
 Children's programming on Telemundo

References

Telemundo
Nickelodeon
NBCUniversal
Television programming blocks
Television programming blocks in the United States
1998 American television series debuts
2001 American television series endings